Ballade på Christianshavn is a 1971 Danish family comedy film directed by Erik Balling, and starring Poul Reichhardt. Karl Stegger won a Bodil Award for Best Actor in a Supporting Role for his role as caretaker Frederiksen.

Cast 

 Poul Reichhardt – Flyttemand Olsen
 Helle Virkner – Fru Olsen
 Jes Holtsø – William Olsen
 Paul Hagen – Dyrehandler Clausen
 Lis Løwert – Fru Clausen
 Kirsten Walther – Karla
 Willy Rathnov – Egon
 Ove Sprogøe – Hr. Larsen
 Arthur Jensen – Vicevært Meyer
  – Rikke
  – Tue
 Bodil Udsen – Emma fra 'Rottehullet'
 Bjørn Watt-Boolsen – Alfred
 Poul Bundgaard – Direktør Hallandsen
 Bjørn Puggaard-Müller – Advokat Thomsen
 Ghita Nørby – Frk. Hansen
 Asbjørn Andersen – Departementchef Schwartz
 Karl Stegger – Vicevært Frederiksen
 Helge Kjærulff-Schmidt – Bankdirektør Ludvigsen
 Jørgen Beck – Henriksen
 Knud Hilding – Postbudet
 Gunnar Strømvad – Krølle
 Freddy Koch – Dideriksen
  – Mand fra belysningsvæsenet
  – Veninde til frk. Hansen
  – Vagt
 Erni Arneson – Sekretær for Ludvigsen
  – Ansat i Boliganvisningen

References

External links 
 
 
 

1970 films
Danish comedy films
1970s Danish-language films
Films directed by Erik Balling
Films with screenplays by Erik Balling